Taming the Garden is a 2021 documentary film directed by Salomé Jashi, a former journalist. It was nominated for the World Cinema Documentary Competition at the 2021 Sundance Film Festival.

Plot
The film documents the extreme lengths that Bidzina Ivanishvili, Georgia's former prime minister and the world's 349th richest billionaire, goes to acquire trees for the construction of the Shekvetili Dendrological Park, an arboretum on his estate on the coast of the Black Sea.

Release
The film had its world premiere at the Sundance Film Festival .

Reception

Critical response
Claire Armitstead said, "Taming the Garden is far from a balanced two-minute news report; it stands at the junction of documentary and myth".

Awards and nominations
It was nominated for the World Cinema Documentary Competition at the 2021 Sundance Film Festival. It was nominated for the 34th European Film Awards. It was nominated for the Audience Award, Insights at the 2021 Vancouver International Film Festival. It won in the international DOCU/WORLD Competition at DocuDays UA International Documentary Human Rights Film Festival.

Salomé Jashi
Salomé Jashi was born in 1981, in Tbilisi, Georgia. She was graduated from Tbilisi State University and the Caucasian School of Journalism and Media Management at Georgian Institute of Public Affairs. Later working as a reporter for a few years. In 2005, she received a scholarship from British Council, to study documentary filmmaking, at Royal Holloway, University of London.

References

External links
 
 

Video Interview with Salomé Jashi on Taming the Garden

2021 films
2021 documentary films
Swiss documentary films
German documentary films
Documentary films from Georgia (country)
2020s Georgian-language films